Chionodes tantella is a moth in the family Gelechiidae. It is found in Mongolia and Russia (Transbaikalia).

References

Chionodes
Moths described in 1995
Moths of Asia